"In These Shoes?" is a song by British singer and songwriter Kirsty MacColl, which was released in 2000 as the second single from her fifth studio album Tropical Brainstorm. It was written by MacColl and Pete Glenister, and produced by MacColl, Glenister and Dave Ruffy.

Background
The song samples "Spanish Grease", a track written by Willie Bobo and Melvin Lastie, and first recorded by Bobo in 1965. During an appearance on Later... with Jools Holland, MacColl said of the song: "It's about being a fashion victim; being a slave to fashion and crippling yourself in the process."

"In These Shoes?" reached number 81 in the UK Singles Chart in March 2000, which provided MacColl with her last entry on the chart, discounting future re-entries of her collaboration with The Pogues, "Fairytale of New York". "In These Shoes?" gained strong airplay on BBC Radio 2, but received little or no attention from other stations in the UK including Independent Local Radio. In the final week of March 2000, the song was played 15 times on Radio Two, making it the station's second most-played song that week, but it had only picked up a further 14 plays on stations monitored by Music Control UK.

Music video
A music video was filmed to promote the single. It was directed by Ben Unwin and produced by Sally Collins. In the book My Kirsty – End of the Fairytale, MacColl's former manager Frank Murray recalled of the video: "We both watched it together and she thought it was so funny – she loved the fact that she barely appears in it."

Critical reception
In a review of Tropical Brainstorm, David Bauder of the Associated Press considered "In These Shoes?" to be a "hilarious song about a woman whose obsession with fashion trumps all other interests". Landon Hall of the Associated Press considered it to be the album's "pinnacle" and described it as a "party record with a catchy Spanish chorus and sultry guitar". Andy Kellman of AllMusic felt the song was "top-shelf material". Billboard described it as "sexy" and "scandalous", and added that it was one of the tracks from Tropical Brainstorm to be among MacColl's "most vibrant work in years".

In popular culture
"In These Shoes?" has been featured on various media and soundtracks, including in a TV advert for Adidas in 2000. It was used in a trailer for the British sitcom Kiss Me Kate and featured in the HBO series Sex and the City. In 2002, it was the theme to the comedy-drama series Any Time Now, and used as the theme tune of the video game This is Football 2003. In 2004, it was featured as the theme tune of the first series of The Catherine Tate Show and was also featured in the 2005 film Kinky Boots (including on its soundtrack album).

Cover versions
 In 2000, American singer Bette Midler recorded her own version of the song for her album Bette. It reached No. 8 on the US Billboard Dance Music/Club Play Singles and No. 14 on the Hot Dance Music/Maxi-Singles Sales charts.
 In 2005, Irish singer Camille O'Sullivan performed the song for inclusion on her live album La Fille Du Cirque. She also performed the song on Later... with Jools Holland in 2008.

Track listing
12" single
"In These Shoes?" (UR Crazy Remix) – 6:04
"In These Shoes?" (UR Crazy Remix Edit) – 3:27
"In These Shoes?" (Extended Moba Club) – 8:02
"In These Shoes?" (Moba Cut) – 4:20
"In These Shoes?" (Album Version) – 3:40

12" single (UK promo)
"In These Shoes?" (Le Rosbifs Mix) – 4:38
"In These Shoes?" (P Mix) – 4:43

CD single
"In These Shoes?" – 3:40
"My Affair" – 3:52
"Good for Me" – 8:08

CD single #2
"In These Shoes?" – 3:40
"In These Shoes?" (Le Rosbifs Mix) – 4:38
"In These Shoes?" (P Mix) – 4:43

CD single (European release)
"In These Shoes?" – 3:40
"In These Shoes?" (UR Crazy Remix) – 6:04
"In These Shoes?" (UR Crazy Remix Edit) – 3:27
"In These Shoes?" (P Mix) – 4:43
"My Affair" (Live) – 8:17

Personnel
 Kirsty MacColl – vocals, autoharp
 Pete Glenister – guitar
 Ben Storey – trumpet
 Dave Ruffy – drums
 Bosco De Oliveira – percussion
 Ernesto Estruch, Felix Gonzalez, Gabriel Fonseca, Omar Puente – backing vocals

Production
 Kirsty MacColl, Pete Glenister, Dave Ruffy – producers
 Lee Groves – additional programming
 UR Production, Maurizio Pini, Max Baffa, Le Rosbifs, Steve P. – remixes

Other
 Stylorouge – design, photography

Charts

References

2000 songs
2000 singles
Kirsty MacColl songs
Songs written by Kirsty MacColl
Songs written by Pete Glenister
V2 Records singles
Comedy television theme songs
Music videos directed by Ben Unwin